Paraxena Demenoi (English: Strange Tied) is the title of the seventh studio album by Greek singer Giorgos Sabanis, released in 2019 by Cobalt Music in Greece and Cyprus.

Track listing

Music videos
 "Skia Sti Gi"
 "Ftaiei"
 "Epilogi"
 "M'Ena Sou Vlemma"
 "Allaxe Ta Ola"
 "Agria Thalassa"

Release history

Charts

Personnel

Soumka – executive producer, mixing
Anestis Psaradakos –  mastering
Hristos Avdelas –  guitar, bass, drums
Foxdesign – artwork
Krida –  background vocals
Panos Giannakopoulos – photography

References

Greek-language albums
2019 albums